"Spark" is a song by Tori Amos, released as the first single from her fourth studio album, From the Choirgirl Hotel (1998).

Background
Amos wrote "Spark" after suffering a miscarriage. She discussed the song in an article from Q magazine in May 1998.

Music video
Amos requested the video for "Spark" to be directed by James Brown, who originally had a different idea for the video that Amos disliked; she requested wanting something "where a girl has a will to live." The video was shot in Dartmoor, South West England and took three days to finish.

Track listings

US CD and cassette single
 "Spark" (album version) – 4:12
 "Purple People" – 3:41

US maxi-CD single
 "Spark"
 "Purple People"
 "Bachelorette"

UK CD1 and Australian CD single
 "Spark"
 "Purple People (Christmas in Space)"
 "Have Yourself a Merry Little Christmas"
 "Bachelorette"

UK CD2
 "Spark"
 "Do It Again" 
 "Cooling"

Charts

Release history

References

External links
 The Dent: Spark single

Tori Amos songs
1998 singles
1998 songs
Atlantic Records singles
East West Records singles